Sodium hydrosulfide is the chemical compound with the formula NaHS. This compound is the product of the half-neutralization of hydrogen sulfide with sodium hydroxide (NaOH). NaSH and sodium sulfide are used industrially, often for similar purposes. Solid NaSH is colorless. The solid has an odor of  owing to hydrolysis by atmospheric moisture. In contrast with sodium sulfide, which is insoluble in organic solvents, NaSH, being a 1:1 electrolyte, is more soluble.

Structure and properties
Crystalline NaHS undergoes two phase transitions. At temperatures above 360 K, NaSH adopts the NaCl structure, which implies that the  behaves as a spherical anion owing to its rapid rotation, leading to equal occupancy of eight equivalent positions. Below 360 K, a rhombohedral structure forms, and the  sweeps out a discoidal shape. Below 114 K, the structure becomes monoclinic. The analogous rubidium and potassium compounds behave similarly.

These three species are all colorless and behave similarly, but not identically. It can be used to precipitate other metal hydrosulfides, by treatment of aqueous solutions of their salts with sodium hydrosulfide. It is analogous to sodium hydroxide, and is a strong base.

Preparation
One laboratory synthesis entails treatment of sodium ethoxide (NaOEt) with hydrogen sulfide:

An alternative method involves reaction of sodium with hydrogen sulfide.

Applications
Thousands of tons of NaSH are produced annually. Its main uses are in cloth and paper manufacture as a makeup chemical for sulfur used in the kraft process, as a flotation agent in copper mining where it is used to activate oxide mineral species, and in the leather industry for the removal of hair from hides.

References

Sodium compounds
Hydrosulfides